The Andridge Apartments is a historic apartment building located at the intersection of Ridge Avenue and Church Street in Evanston, Illinois. The building was built in 1923 and designed by Robert C. Ostergren. The "S"-shaped building has two courtyards, a front courtyard facing Ridge Avenue and a rear courtyard for units on Church Street. The building was designed in the Tudor Revival style and features regularly spaced bays with gables, limestone trim, and Tudor arches around its entrances. On March 15, 1984, the building was added to the National Register of Historic Places.

References

Buildings and structures on the National Register of Historic Places in Cook County, Illinois
Tudor Revival architecture in Illinois
Residential buildings completed in 1923
Buildings and structures in Evanston, Illinois
Residential buildings on the National Register of Historic Places in Illinois